Brad Turner is a Canadian jazz trumpeter and pianist. He has won three Juno Awards and six Canadian National Jazz Awards for categories including Jazz Trumpeter of the Year, Jazz Composer of the Year, and Musician of the Year.

Career
Turner graduated from R. E. Mountain Secondary School in 1985, and attended Western Washington University's jazz studies program. A year later he transferred to University of North Texas, and played and composed for the very well known One O'Clock Lab Band. He graduated from UNT in 1992 after finishing his master's degree.

Upon graduation, Turner returned to Vancouver and formed the Brad Turner Quartet, which consisted of Bruno Hubert on piano, André Lachance on bass, and Dylan Van der Schyff on drums. The four have been playing together since, and have established themselves as one of Canada's most respected jazz groups.  Turner also has the long-standing "Brad Turner Trio" (with Andre Lachance on bass and Bernie Arai on drums), where he mostly plays piano.

Turner was one of the founding members of the jazz fusion group Metalwood which formed in 1997. The members played together until 2003, and had a reunion album released in 2016 entitled Twenty (referring to their 20th anniversary as a group). Later that year, the group went on tour to support the album, which lead them to winning a Juno Award as best group jazz album of the year.

Turner has also performed and recorded with such artists as Michael Brecker, Joe Lovano, Kenny Wheeler, John Scofield, Michael Moore, Renee Rosnes, Jimmy Greene, Ingrid Jensen, Dylan Van der Schyff, Mike Murley, Seamus Blake, Kenny Werner, and Ernie Watts.

Turner currently lives in Vancouver, British Columbia, and is on faculty at Capilano University in North Vancouver, where he has been teaching for over two decades. He has also been the director of Capilano University's A band ensemble since the late 1990s.

Discography

As leader
 1994 - Long Story Short - Brad Turner Quartet
 1998 - There and Back - Brad Turner Quartet
 1999 - Live at the Cellar - Brad Turner Quartet with Seamus Blake (Recorded live at Cellar Jazz Club)
 2005 - Question the Answer (2005) - Brad Turner Trio
 2005 - What Is - Brad Turner Quartet
 2007 - Small Wonder - Brad Turner Quartet
 2011 - It's That Time - Brad Turner Quartet, (Recorded live at Cory Weeds' Cellar Jazz Club)
 2015 - Here Now - Brad Turner Trio
 2015 - Over My Head - Brad Turner Quartet
 2018 - Pacific - Brad Turner
 2019 - Jump Up - Brad Turner Quartet

With Metalwood 
 1997 - Metalwood
 1998 - Metalwood 2
 1999 - Metalwood Live
 2001 - Metalwood 3
 2001 - Recline
 2003 - Chronic
 2016 - Twenty

Awards
2020: Juno Award for Jazz Album of the Year – Group nomination (for "Jump Up", with Brad Turner Quartet)
2017: Juno Award for Best Group Jazz Album (For album Twenty, with Metalwood)
2015: Juno nomination for Best Traditional Jazz Album (for album "Over My Head", with Brad Turner Quartet)
2009: Juno nomination for Best Traditional Jazz Album (for album "Small Wonder", with Brad Turner Quartet)
2008: Nominated for Canadian National Jazz Awards for Instrumentalist of the Year
2008: Canadian National Jazz Award for Producer of the Year
2008: Canadian National Jazz Award for Trumpeter of the Year
2006: Best Jazz Album at the 2006 Western Canadian Music Awards (for album "What Is",with Brad Turner Quartet)
2006: Nominated for Canadian Indie Music Awards (for the album "Question the Answer")
2006: Recipient of the Victor Lynch - Staunton Prize for excellence in musical achievement.
2005: Nominated for Canadian Urban Music Awards (for the album "Question the Answer", Brad Turner Trio)
2005: Canadian National Jazz Award for Musician of the Year
2002: Juno nomination for Best Contemporary Jazz Album (for album "The Recline", with Metalwood)
2002: Canadian National Jazz Award for Jazz Trumpeter of the Year
2001: Juno nomination for Best Contemporary Jazz Album (for "Metalwood 3", with Metalwood)
2001: Jazz Report magazine's Jazz Composer of the Year
2000: Canadian National Jazz Award for Jazz Composer of the Year
1999: Jazz Report magazine's Trumpeter of the Year
1999: Canadian National Jazz Award for Jazz Trumpeter of the Year
1998: Jazz Report magazine's Jazz Composer of the Year
1998: Juno Award for Best Contemporary Jazz Album (with Metalwood)
1997: Juno Award for Best Contemporary Jazz Album (with Metalwood)

References

External links
 

1967 births
Living people
Canadian jazz trumpeters
Male trumpeters
Academic staff of Capilano University
Juno Award winners
University of North Texas College of Music alumni
21st-century trumpeters
21st-century Canadian male musicians
Canadian male jazz musicians